Zombie Detective is a South Korean fantasy television series starring Choi Jin-hyuk and Park Ju-hyun. The series is produced by KBS Drama Production and RaemongRaein and aired on KBS2 from September 21 to October 27, 2020. It tells the story of a zombie and a writer who team up to solve crimes.

Synopsis 
Kang Min-ho (Choi Jin-hyuk) wakes up and discovers that he is a zombie with no memories of his past. He trains himself to walk and talk like a human, covers up his scars with makeup, and assumes the identity of private detective Kim Moo-young while trying to solve the mystery of his past. Gong Sun-ji (Park Ju-hyun) is a former investigative journalist who gets hired as a part-time assistant at Moo-young’s agency. She discovers Moo-young's zombie secret, and the two team up to solve crimes and discover the mystery behind the existence of zombies.

Cast

Main 
 Choi Jin-hyuk as Kim Moo-young/Kang Min-ho
 Park Ju-hyun as Gong Sun-ji
 Kwon Hwa-woon as Cha Do-hyun

Supporting

World King Agency 
 Tae Hang-ho as Lee Sung-rok
 Lee Joong-ok as Wang Wei

Gong Sun-ji's family 
 Ahn Se-ha as Lee Tae-kyun
 Hwang Bo-ra as Gong Sun-young
 Sung Min-jun as Lee Joon-woo

Gangrim Police Station 
 Park Dong-bin as Hwang Chun-seob
 Jung Chae-yul as Bae Yoon-mi

Others 
 Lim Se-joo as Kim Bo-ra
 Bae Yoo-ram as Station PD
 Park Sang-myun as Lee Gwang-sik
 Ha Do-kwon as Noh Poong-sik
 Seo Yeon-woo as Yeon-woo
 Uhm Tae-yoon as Um Tae-yoon
 Yoon Ki-chang as real Kim Moo-young

Special appearances 
 Park Joo-yong as Santa suspect (Ep. 1)
 Yoo Min-sang as pizza box man (Ep. 1)
 Lee Seung-yoon as zombie movie actor (Ep. 1)
 Kim Hye-seon as zombie movie actress (Ep. 1)
 Yoo Jae-suk as zombie movie poster actor (Ep. 1)
 Kim Min-kyung as zombie movie poster actress (Ep. 1)
 Kim Yo-han as skin cream CM model (Ep. 1)
 Lee Ga-sub as Oh Hyeong-cheol (Ep. 2)
 Han Hye-ji as Oh Hyeong-cheol's wife (Ep. 2)
 Song Ga-in as trot singer (Ep. 2)
 A.C.E as zombie dancer (Ep. 2–3)
 Shin Yun-sook as Kim Moo-young's landlord (Ep. 2)
 Ok Joo-ri as food cart vendor (Ep. 2)
 Kwon Hae-hyo as movie company CEO (Ep. 2)
 Lee Young-ji as paramedic (Ep. 2)
 Kim Jung-pal as fast center manager (Ep. 3)
 Jang Se-hyun as fast center client (Ep. 3)
 Park Sun-young as Kang Go-eun (Ep. 3)
 Yebin as Yoo Hee-seon (Ep. 3)
 Sam Hammington as Butcher (Ep. 5)
 William Hammington as Butcher son (Ep. 5)
 Ryu Hye-rin as Shaman (Ep. 6)

Production 
KBS released the photos from the first script reading on July 22, 2020. KBS released the main poster of the series featuring all the casts.

Viewership

Awards and nominations

References

External links 
  
 
 
 

Korean Broadcasting System television dramas
Korean-language television shows
2020 South Korean television series debuts
2020 South Korean television series endings
South Korean mystery television series
South Korean fantasy television series
South Korean comedy television series
South Korean horror fiction television series
Television series by RaemongRaein